Amma Vandhachu is a 1992 Indian Tamil-language comedy drama film written and directed by P. Vasu, and produced by Poornima Bhagyaraj. The film stars K. Bhagyaraj, Khushbu and Baby Sridevi, with Delhi Ganesh, Vennira Aadai Moorthy, Chelladurai, Pandu, Rajesh Kumar, LIC Narasimhan and Junior Balaiah in supporting roles. It was released on 26 June 1992 and failed at the box office. For her performance, Sridevi won the Cinema Express Award for Best Child Artist.

Plot 

Nandakumar, a medical representative, is a bachelor and lives alone in Bombay. He starts to meet the smart and quick-tempered woman Nandini in various situations. Nandini sells detergent soap door to door, she lives with her father, a retired teacher. Nandakumar wants to get married as soon as possible, so he tries to seduce the bubbly Nandini. They both fall in love with each other. Even Nandini's father accepts for their marriage. Everything goes well until the arrival of Vimala, a four-year girl. She introduces herself to Nandini as Vimala Nandakumar and she says that Nandakumar is her father. Nandini, with a broken heart, leaves the city with her father. What transpires later forms the crux of the story.

Cast 

K. Bhagyaraj as Nandakumar
Khushbu as Nandini
Baby Sridevi as Vimala
Delhi Ganesh as Nandini's father
Vennira Aadai Moorthy as Mahalingam
Chelladurai as Naina Mohamed
Pandu as Senior officer
Rajesh Kumar as Ramesh
LIC Narasimhan as Businessman
S. S. Mani as Rajapalayam
Junior Balaiah as Senior officer
Soundararajan as Incense stick seller
Vijaya Chandrika as Mahalingam's wife
C. R. Saraswathi as School teacher

Production 
The action scenes were choreographed by Vikram Dharma.

Soundtrack 
The soundtrack was composed by Deva, with lyrics written by Vaali.

Release and reception 
Amma Vandhachu was released on 26 June 1992 and distributed by Surya Films. Lalitha Dileep of The Indian Express stated, "an entertainment film; a fine amalgame of sentiment and subtle comedy that bear the trademark of Bhagyaraj's film" and praised the lead performances. K. Vijiyan of New Straits Times wrote, "this movie should satisfy all Bhagiaraj fans looking for his own brand of humour". C. R. K. of Kalki praised the film's comedy but noted that the film became too serious in second half. According to Bhagyaraj, the film underperformed commercially because "the first part was funny and the last too serious". At the 13th Cinema Express Awards, Sridevi won the award for Best Child Artist.

References

External links 
 

1990s Tamil-language films
1992 comedy-drama films
1992 films
Films directed by P. Vasu
Films scored by Deva (composer)
Indian comedy-drama films